Aratz Gallastegui Sodupe (born 4 September 1976 in Berango) is a Spanish former rugby union player. He played as a scrum-half. In his home region, the Basque Country, his name is often spelled as Aratz Gallastegi.

Career
He debuted for the Spain national rugby union team in a test match against Andorra on 8 November 1997. Gallastegui also played two matches of the 1999 Rugby World Cup for Spain against South Africa and Scotland, the latter being his last international cap for Spain. At club level, he mainly played for Getxo Artea RT. 
After retiring as player, Gallastegui became coach of Durango RT in 2008. From 2014 he is the backs coach of Ordizia Rugby Elkartea.

References

External links
 

1976 births
Living people
Sportspeople from Biscay
Spanish rugby union players
Rugby union players from the Basque Country (autonomous community)
Rugby union scrum-halves
Spain international rugby union players
People from Greater Bilbao